Pierre Lavraie was a French swimmer. He competed in the men's 1500 metre freestyle event at the 1920 Summer Olympics.

References

External links
 

Year of birth missing
Year of death missing
Olympic swimmers of France
Swimmers at the 1920 Summer Olympics
Place of birth missing
French male freestyle swimmers